KJS is KDE's ECMAScript-JavaScript engine that was originally developed for the KDE project's Konqueror web browser by Harri Porten in 2000.

On June 13, 2002, Maciej Stachowiak announced on a mailing list that Apple was releasing JavaScriptCore, a framework for Mac OS X that was based on KJS. Through the WebKit project, JavaScriptCore has since evolved into SquirrelFish Extreme, a JavaScript engine that compiles JavaScript into native machine code.

See also
KDE Frameworks

References

External links

KJS (KDE JavaScript/EcmaScript Engine) - api.kde.org
KJSEmbed (allows access to QObjects from JavaScript)
KJSEmbed Documentation
OpenDarwin's JavaScript engine based on KJS

KDE Frameworks
KDE Platform
JavaScript engines